The 1940 United States presidential election in New York took place on November 5, 1940. All contemporary 48 states were part of the 1940 United States presidential election. Voters had chosen 47 electors to the Electoral College, which selected the president and vice president.

New York was won by incumbent Democratic President Franklin D. Roosevelt of New York, who was running against Republican businessman Wendell Willkie of New York. Roosevelt ran with Henry A. Wallace of Iowa, and  Willkie ran with Senator Charles L. McNary of Oregon.

A former Governor of New York who had easily carried the state in his previous two presidential campaigns, Franklin Roosevelt again won New York State in 1940, but by a much closer margin. Roosevelt took 51.50% of the vote versus Wendell Willkie's 47.95%, a margin of 3.55%. This is the only one of his four elections in which New York was decided by less than 5%.

New York weighed in for this election as 6% more Republican than the national average.

The presidential election of 1940 was a very partisan election for New York, with 99.45% of the electorate casting votes for either the Democratic Party or the Republican. In typical form for the time, the highly populated centers of New York City, Albany, Buffalo, and Rochester voted primarily Democratic, while the majority of smaller counties in New York turned out for Willkie as the Republican candidate. Much of Roosevelt's margin of victory was provided by his dominance in New York City. Roosevelt took over 60% of the vote in Manhattan, Brooklyn and the Bronx, and decisively won New York City as a whole. However, the boroughs of Queens and Staten Island flipped to the Republican side in 1940 after voting for FDR in 1932 and 1936, a major contributing factor as to why the race was much closer than the 20-point margin that FDR had won the state by in 1936, along with Willkie also winning the counties of Schenectady, Montgomery, Rockland and Sullivan, all of which Roosevelt had won in 1936.

Results

Results by county

See also
 United States presidential elections in New York
 Presidency of Franklin D. Roosevelt

References

New York
1940
1940 New York (state) elections